"She Is Suffering" is a song by Welsh alternative rock band Manic Street Preachers. It was released in October 1994 by record label Epic as the third and final single from the band's third studio album, The Holy Bible. It was their last single to feature Richey Edwards before his disappearance on 1 February 1995. The single reached number 25 on the UK Singles Chart on 15 October 1994.

Content 

According to its lyricist, Richey Edwards, the song's title refers to "Desire. In other bibles and holy books, no truth is possible until you empty yourself of desire. All commitment otherwise is fake/lies/economic convenience". Nicky Wire also noted, "It's quite a simple song, both musically and lyrically. It's kind of like the Buddhist thing where you can only reach eternal peace by shedding every desire in your body."

Promotion 

Promotion for the single included James Dean Bradfield performing an acoustic version of the song on RTÉ's Sunday afternoon TV/radio simulcast The Beatbox

Music video 

A promo video for the song was directed by Alfonso Doring, which featured performance clips interspersed with shots of art mannequins. In the music magazine Melody Maker, Wire described the music video to "She Is Suffering" as "absolute shite beyond belief". It was released on the band's Forever Delayed video compilation DVD (2002).

Track listings 

 All live tracks were recorded at the Clapham Grand, Battersea, London, England, on 2 March 1994 in aid of the Philip Hall Memorial Fund for Cancer Research.

Charts

References

Sources 
 

1994 singles
1994 songs
Epic Records singles
Manic Street Preachers songs
Songs written by James Dean Bradfield
Songs written by Nicky Wire
Songs written by Richey Edwards
Songs written by Sean Moore (musician)